The following lists events that happened during 1955 in Cape Verde.

Incumbents
Colonial governor: Manuel Marques de Abrantes Amaral

Events
Rádio Barlavento in Mindelo begins broadcasting

References

 
1955 in the Portuguese Empire
Years of the 20th century in Cape Verde
1950s in Cape Verde
Cape Verde
Cape Verde